Neptunomonas is an anaerobic and rod-shaped genus from the family of Oceanospirillaceae.

References

Further reading 
 
 
 
 

Oceanospirillales
Bacteria genera